Hélder Nunes  (born 23 February 1994) is a Portuguese roller hockey player who currently plays for FC Barcelona and the Portugal national roller hockey team.

Honours

Club
Porto
Portuguese Championship: 2012–13, 2016–17, 2018–19
Portuguese Cup: 2012–13, 2015–16, 2016–17, 2017–18
Portuguese Supercup: 2013, 2016, 2017, 2018

Barcelona
Catalan League: 2019–20

International
Portugal
Roller Hockey World Cup: 2019
Roller Hockey European Championship: 2016
Roller Hockey Nations Cup: 2013, 2015, 2019
Roller Hockey Latin Cup: 2014, 2016
Roller Hockey U20 World Cup: 2013
Roller Hockey U20 European Championship: 2012
Roller Hockey U17 European Championship: 2009

Orders
 Grand Cross of the Order of Merit
 Commander of the Order of Merit

References

Living people
1994 births
Portuguese roller hockey players
People from Barcelos, Portugal
Sportspeople from Braga District